Marcelo Leite Pereira (born 22 June 1987), known as Marcelinho, is a retired Brazilian professional footballer who played as a winger or an attacking midfielder.

Having started his professional career with Spanish club Atlético Madrid B, Marcelinho has played for Brazilian, Spanish, Greek, Emirati and Indian clubs. He amassed more than 100 caps with Greek club Skoda Xanthi. His Major Club career success came in India at ISL as he finished 2016 Indian Super League season as the league's top scorer and won the Golden Boot with Delhi Dyanamos. Then he went on to play for Pune City in the ISL in 2017–18 and 2018–19 season.

Club career
Born in Rio de Janeiro, Marcelinho started his senior professional career at the age of 18 with the reserves of Atlético Madrid, followed by a stint with Getafe CF B. In 2008, he signed a contract with Kalamata. After a few months there he signed a contract with Skoda Xanthi and he stayed there for four years and then he signed with Baniyas in UAE, for a fee of €600,000. At Skoda Xanthi, Marcelinho played 115 games( 17 goals, 14 assists) in all competitions.

In March 2014 Sky Sport reported that Marcelinho had signed a one-year contract (with an option for two additional years)  with Catania. Eventually, on 12 July 2014, it was officially announced that Marcelinho signed a one-year contract with Catania on a free transfer.

On 18 January 2015, he signed with Atromitos F.C. on a -year contract. On 30 July 2015, in a game for UEFA Europa League preliminary round against AIK Solna, he was the man of the match having one assist, a goal and a drawn penalty, in a victorious 3–1 away win. On 4 February 2016, he mutually agreed with the club to rescind his contract.

On 25 August 2016, Marcelinho switched to the Indian Super League with Delhi Dynamos FC. Head coach Gianluca Zambrotta said that his experience would help the team. On 6 October, he made his first team debut, scoring a brace in a 3–1 victory against Chennaiyin FC. On 27 November, he scored a hat-trick in a 5–1 routing of FC Goa. He also scored found the net in a 2–1 victory against Kerala Blasters in the semi-finals. He ended the season as the league's top scorer with 10 goals and subsequently won the Golden Boot.

On 16 January 2017, Marcelinho signed with Brazilian top tier club Avaí FC. In August, he returned to the Indian Super League with FC Pune City. On 26 November, he scored a brace in a 4–1 victory against ATK. On 30 December, he scored a hat-trick against NorthEast United FC as his side won by 5–0.

On 2 September 2020, Marcelinho joined ISL club Odisha FC for the 2020–21 Indian Super League season.

On 26 January 2021, He swapped club with Brad Inman and joined ATK Mohun Bagan FC on loan till the end of 2020–21 Indian Super League season. He scored his first goal in debut for ATK Mohun Bagan.

On 23 April 2021, Marcelinho joined Esporte Clube Taubaté that competes in the Campeonato Paulista Série A2, the second tier of the São Paulo State league.

On 6 January 2022, Marcelinho joined NorthEast United from Rajasthan United on loan deal till the end of 2021–22 Indian Super League season. He made his debut against Chennaiyin on 21 January, which ended in a 2–1 loss as a substitute for Laldanmawia Ralte in the 64th minute of the game.

Style of play
Mainly a left winger, Marcelinho can also play on the right wing. Since his youth days, he has been playing as a winger or as a second striker. In an interview, he said that he considered "a wide position to be his favourite on the pitch" because it gave him space to run.

Personal life 
He is married to Juliana. They parent Giovanna (born 15 November 2013) and Enrico (born 6 December 2017)

Career statistics

Honours 
Individual
 Indian Super League Golden Boot: 2016

References

External links

1987 births
Living people
Association football wingers
Association football forwards
Brazilian footballers
Brazilian expatriate footballers
Super League Greece players
Serie B players
Getafe CF B players
Kalamata F.C. players
Xanthi F.C. players
Tombense Futebol Clube players
Baniyas Club players
Catania S.S.D. players
Atromitos F.C. players
Expatriate footballers in Greece
Ipatinga Futebol Clube players
UAE Pro League players
Expatriate footballers in the United Arab Emirates
Brazilian expatriate sportspeople in the United Arab Emirates
Expatriate footballers in Italy
Odisha FC players
NorthEast United FC players
Brazilian expatriate sportspeople in India
Expatriate footballers in India
Indian Super League players
Hyderabad FC players
FC Pune City players
Footballers from Rio de Janeiro (city)